Kilo may refer to:
kilo-, a metric prefix denoting a factor of 103
Kilogram, a metric unit of mass

Music 
KILO, a Colorado radio station
El Kilo, a 2005 album by the Cuban hip hop group Orishas

People 
Kilo Ali or Kilo (born 1973), American rapper
Kilo Kish (born 1990), American singer/songwriter
Michel Kilo (1940–2021), Syrian Christian writer and human rights activist
Wiz Kilo (born 1984), Syrian Canadian hip hop and electronic artist

Places 
Kilo, Espoo, a district of Espoo, Finland
Kilo railway station, a commuter rail network in Kilo, Espoo, Finland
Kilonväylä or Kilo Highway, an alternative name of the Ring II beltway in Espoo, Finland

Other 
Kilo-class submarine, the NATO reporting name for a type of Russian submarine
 The letter K in the NATO phonetic alphabet
 Men's 1 km Time Trial, a cycling track time trial

See also
 Klio (disambiguation)
 
 Kilobyte (disambiguation)